Country Mouse City House is the seventh album by indie folk musician Josh Rouse.  It was released in 2007 by Bedroom Classics.

Track listing
All songs written by Josh Rouse unless otherwise noted

 "Sweetie" (Josh Rouse, Paz Suay) — 4:51
 "Italian Dry Ice" — 4:41
 "Hollywood Bass Player" — 4:06
 "God, Please Let Me Go Back" — 4:19
 "Nice to Fit In" — 3:29
 "Pilgrim" (Josh Rouse, Paz Suay) — 4:22
 "Domesticated Lovers" (Josh Rouse, Paz Suay) — 3:28
 "London Bridges" — 4:04
 "Snowy" — 5:14

References

Josh Rouse albums
2007 albums